This is a list of provincial parks in Southwestern Ontario. These provincial parks are maintained by Ontario Parks. For a list of other provincial parks in Ontario, see the List of provincial parks in Ontario.

Bruce County

Chatham-Kent

Elgin County

Essex County

Grey County

Haldimand County

Huron County

Lambton County

Middlesex County

Norfolk County

Oxford County 

Ontario
Provincial parks, Southwestern Ontario
Provincial parks in Canada
Southwestern Ontario